François-Xavier Fabre (1 April 1766 – 16 March 1837) was a French painter of historical subjects.

Born in Montpellier, Fabre was a pupil of Jacques-Louis David, and made his name by winning the Prix de Rome in 1787.

During the French Revolution, Fabre went to live in Florence, becoming a member of the Florentine Academy, where he taught painting.  The friends he made in Italy included the dramatist, Vittorio Alfieri, whose widow, Princess Louise of Stolberg-Gedern, Countess of Albany, he is said to have married.  On Louise's death in 1824, he inherited her fortune, which he used to found an art school in his home town.  On his own death, he bequeathed his own art collection to the town, forming the basis of the Musée Fabre.

Fabre began his training in the Montpellier's art academy, where he spent several years prior to joining Jacques-Louis David's studio in Paris. His studies were paid for by the financier and art collector, Philippe-Laurent de Joubert. Philippe-Laurent was the father of Laurent-Nicolas de Joubert. Fabre painted a portrait of Laurent-Nicolas de Joubert, which is now in the Getty Museum. Fabre gained popularity in Florence. The city's Italian aristocrats and tourists were drawn to his elegance, realism, and precision of his portraits. This popularity earned Fabre a place in the Florentine Academy. He became an art teacher, art collector, and art dealer in Florence.

Fabre's works include The Dying Saint Sebastian (1789), The Judgment of Paris (1808), and The Death of Narcissus (1814).

Among his pupils in Florence was Emilio Santarelli.

Notable works

References

18th-century French painters
French male painters
19th-century French painters
1766 births
1837 deaths
Prix de Rome for painting
Pupils of Jacques-Louis David
Artists from Montpellier
French expatriates in Italy
18th-century French male artists